Crosstalk refers to any signal or circuit unintentionally affecting another signal or circuit.

Crosstalk may also refer to:

Science and computing
 Crosstalk (biology)
 Crosstalk Mk.4, a communications application for PCs.

Arts and entertainment
 Cross talk, a style of comedy used in performance by double acts
 Xiangsheng, also translated as "crosstalk", a traditional Chinese comedic monologue or dialogue
 Crosstalk (novel), a 2016 novel by American science fiction author Connie Willis
 Crosstalk (film), a 1982 science fiction thriller film
 Cross Talk, a 1980 album by the Pretty Things
 Crosstalk: American Speech Music, a compilation album by the produced by Mendi + Keith Obadike
 CrossTalk (TV series), a television program on the Russian-based international broadcaster RT
 Cross Talk, a defunct radio show hosted by Indian RJ Balaji